This is a list of Singapore’s electoral divisions which were existence during the period of 1951 to 1955 between the 1951 and 1955 elections. The pre-existing four districts for the 1948 elections were redrawn into nine districts, each with one seat in the Legislative Council.

Changes

External links 
Map of electoral divisions

1951